The Association of University Presses (International Association of University Presses) e.V. is an international nonprofit association of university presses, its members as well as of regional university press associations. It was founded 2013/2014 in Bochum, Germany following an initiative of the International Convention of University Presses on the Frankfurt Book Fair in 2013.

Membership 
The Association in 2014 has more than 30 members from North and South America, Europe, Africa, Asia, Oceania and Australia, it offers a multilingual forum for university presses. The members dedicate their work to the scientific and scholarly community and the common welfare and fulfill an important social function of education, spread of knowledge and societal progress.

Support of other associations 
The association supports likewise minded regional associations, e.g. the Association of University Presses and other initiatives like Open Access or the International Convention of University Presses on the Frankfurt Book Fair.

List of members 
The Association in 2014 lists the following institutional members on its website:

Africa
ESSTIC University Press, University of Yaounde II, Cameroun

Asia
Guangxi Normal University Press, Guilin, Guangxi, China
Batumi Shota Rustaveli State University, Georgia
Kentavri - Publishing House of Georgian Shota Rustaveli Theatre and Film University, Georgia

Australia
University of Queensland Press (UQP)
University of Western Australia Press
Monash University Publishing
UNSW Press

Europe
West German University Press, Bochum, Germany
Editorial de la Universidad de Cantabria, Spain
Imprensa da Universidade de Coimbra, Portugal
Crete University Press, Greece
RomaTrE-Press, Italy
European University Press, Network of European University Presses, Subgroup of the Association of University Presses

North America
Rochester Institute of Technology Press
Athabasca University PressAltexto, Network of Mexican University PressesEditorial Universidad Veracruzana, MexicoEditorial Universidad Autónoma de Nuevo León, MexicoEditorial Universidad de Guadalajara, MexicoEditorial Universidad Autonoma del Estado de Mexico, MexicoEditorial Universidad Nacional Autónoma de MéxicoSouth AmericaEditorial Universidad del Rosario, Colombia''

References

External links 
 Website of the global association AUP
 Website of a regional association and AUP member

Publishing-related professional associations
University presses